Verkhneye Sazovo (Ürge Haź) is a rural locality (a village) in Maxyutovsky Selsoviet, Kugarchinsky District, Bashkortostan, Russia. The population was 179 as of 2010. There are 2 streets.

Geography 
Verkhneye Sazovo is located 50 km south of Mrakovo (the district's administrative centre) by road. Nizhneye Sazovo is the nearest rural locality.

References 

Rural localities in Kugarchinsky District